Petit Jesus Ngnitedem (born 22 August 1984) is a Gabonese bantamweight boxer. He competed at the 2004 Summer Olympics in Athens, Greece. He lost in the round of 32 to Nigerian Nestor Bolum.

External links
 Profile on Yahoo! Sports

1984 births
Living people
Gabonese male boxers
Olympic boxers of Gabon
Boxers at the 2004 Summer Olympics
Bantamweight boxers
21st-century Gabonese people
Place of birth missing (living people)